Sam Tai Tsz Temple and Pak Tai Temple is a complex of two temples in Nos.196 and 198, Yu Chau Street, Sham Shui Po, New Kowloon, Hong Kong. It is a place of worship dedicated to both Deities, Sam Tai Tsz and Pak Tai.

The Sam Tai Tsz Temple is graded as Grade II historic building, while the Pak Tai Temple is a Grade III historic building. The interior of the complex can be explored with Google Street View.

Sam Tai Tsz Temple
Sam Tai Tsz Temple was built in 1898. 
The temple was built for the god Sam Tai Tsz (also named Na Cha), for his miracle to dissipate an outbreak of plague in 1894  in the area.  The god was invited from the temple in Wai Chau by Hakkas.

It is the only temple worshipping Sam Tai Tsz, in Hong Kong.

Pak Tai Temple
Pak Tai Temple of the complex was built in 1920 by the fishermen living in Sham Shui Po for worshipping Pak Tai, the God of the North.

See also
 Wan Chai Pak Tai Temple
 Yuk Hui Temple in Cheung Chau
 Chinese Temples Committee

References

External links

 Geographical Information System on Hong Kong Heritage 
 Sam Tai Tsz Temple
 Photographs of Sam Tai Tsz Temple
 Pak Tai Temple
 Photographs of Pak Tai Temple

Sham Shui Po
Taoist temples in Hong Kong
Grade II historic buildings in Hong Kong
Grade III historic buildings in Hong Kong